Central provinces may refer to:

 Central Canada
 Central Provinces of former British India (1861–1936)
 Central Provinces and Berar of former British India (1936–1950)

See also
 Central Province (disambiguation)